P. macrophyllum may refer to:
 Phoradendron macrophyllum, the Colorado desert mistletoe, bigleaf mistletoe or Christmas mistletoe, a flowering plant species native to western North America
 Polygonum macrophyllum, a synonym for Bistorta macrophylla, a plant species found in Asia

See also